Selau is a district in Autonomous Region of Bougainville of Papua New Guinea.

Selau may also refer to:
Selau language, a dialect of Halia
Jelly Selau (born 1983), Tuvaluan footballer
Selau (singer), singer featured on Messy Marv 2006 album What You Know bout Me?
Gaolaolwe Joseph Selau, member of the 25th Parliament of South Africa